Chen Hsiu-hui (born 7 May 1962) is a Taiwanese Amis politician.

Activism
Chen attended Chung Chi College in Hong Kong and is a minister of the Presbyterian Church of Taiwan. She has also been active in the Foundation of Women's Rights Promotion and Development and the National Cultural Association.

Chen is the founding chair of the Homemakers' Union, and has led the National Alliance of Taiwan Women's Associations.

Political career
Chen was listed on the Democratic Progressive Party list and elected to the Legislative Yuan via proportional representation in 2004. She criticized a 2004 bill regarding land restoration and conservation, stating, "Land restoration and conservation should be a national issue, not the sole responsibility of aboriginal peoples. If the government really wants the draft to benefit indigenous peoples, it can approve various budgets, such as for a forest protection fund, to assist them with practical sustainable development plans." As written, the bill was vague, not practical, and amounted to political propaganda, she believed. Chen also derided government attempts to promote aboriginal languages. Chen supported the caning of people who have committed sex crimes.

She was named the leader of Taipei's Indigenous Peoples Commission by mayor Ko Wen-je in December 2014, and began receiving pressure to resign in 2016, after she made remarks that stigmatized Atayals.

References

1962 births
Living people
Taiwanese Presbyterians
Taiwanese Christian clergy
Party List Members of the Legislative Yuan
Members of the 6th Legislative Yuan
Democratic Progressive Party Members of the Legislative Yuan
21st-century Taiwanese women politicians
Taiwanese feminists
Alumni of the Chinese University of Hong Kong
Amis people
Taiwanese expatriates in Hong Kong
Taiwanese politicians of indigenous descent
Politicians of the Republic of China on Taiwan from Taitung County